Lazare Kupatadze (born 8 February 1996) is a Georgian footballer who plays as a goalkeeper for Dinamo Batumi and the Georgia national team.

Career
Kupatadze made his international debut for Georgia on 2 June 2021, starting in a friendly match against Romania.

Career statistics

International

References

External links
 

1996 births
Living people
Footballers from Tbilisi
Footballers from Georgia (country)
Georgia (country) under-21 international footballers
Georgia (country) international footballers
Association football goalkeepers
FC Saburtalo Tbilisi players
FC Locomotive Tbilisi players
Jeunesse Esch players
FC Dinamo Batumi players
Erovnuli Liga players
Erovnuli Liga 2 players
Luxembourg National Division players
Expatriate footballers from Georgia (country)
Expatriate sportspeople from Georgia (country) in Luxembourg
Expatriate footballers in Luxembourg